Rear Admiral Basil Charles Godfrey Place,  (19 July 1921 – 27 December 1994), known as Godfrey Place, was an officer in the Royal Navy and a recipient of the Victoria Cross, the highest award for gallantry in the face of the enemy that can be awarded to British and Commonwealth forces.

Naval career

Place was 22 years old, and a lieutenant in the Royal Navy during the Second World War, when the following deed took place for which he was awarded the VC. On 22 September 1943 at Kåfjord, North Norway, Lieutenant Place, commanding Midget Submarine X7, and another lieutenant (Donald Cameron) commanding Midget Submarine X.6, carried out a most daring and successful attack on the German Battleship Tirpitz. The two submarines had to travel at least 1,000 miles from base, negotiate a mine-field, dodge nets, gun defenses and enemy listening posts. Having eluded all these hazards they finally placed the charges underneath the ship where they went off an hour later, doing so much damage that Tirpitz was out of action for months.

The full citation was published in a supplement to the London Gazette of 18 February 1944 (dated 22 February 1944) and read:

In 1950, Place took the unusual step for a submariner of transferring to the Fleet Air Arm, training as a pilot and gaining his "wings" in 1952. Later that year he saw action in the Korean War, flying the Sea Fury in 801 Squadron from the deck of the carrier . He later achieved the rank of rear admiral.

The medal
Place's Victoria Cross is displayed at the Imperial War Museum in London.

Notes

External links
Location of grave and VC medal (Somerset)

1921 births
1994 deaths
Burials in Somerset
Military personnel from Worcestershire
British World War II prisoners of war
British World War II recipients of the Victoria Cross
Commanders of the Order of Aviz
Commanders of the Royal Victorian Order
Companions of the Order of the Bath
Fleet Air Arm aviators
People from Malvern Hills District
Recipients of the Cross of Valour (Poland)
Recipients of the Distinguished Service Cross (United Kingdom)
Royal Navy rear admirals
Royal Navy officers of World War II
Royal Navy personnel of the Korean War
Royal Navy recipients of the Victoria Cross
Royal Navy submarine commanders
World War II prisoners of war held by Germany